The 1909 Texas A&M Aggies football team represented Texas A&M during the 1909 college football season.

Schedule

References

Texas AandM
Texas A&M Aggies football seasons
College football undefeated seasons
Texas AandM